Donald Snyder (born 1936) is a retired lieutenant general in the United States Air Force who served as vice commander of Tactical Air Command from 1991 until his retirement in 1992.

References

1936 births
Living people
United States Air Force generals